James Smith Drummond (?-1881) was mayor of Victoria

Personal life
He was born in Scotland and came to Victoria in the 1850s.

He married John Tod's daughter Elizabeth.

Mayor
He was first elected in 1875

Votes:
James Drummond 299
Charles Morton 232

Many people, especially Amor de Cosmos, were upset Drummond won because a lot of Chinese people voted for him.  All property owners were allowed to vote which in included Chinese, blacks and even women.  Three of the voters for Drummond in 1875 were women.

He ran again in 1876 and defeated W.R.Clarke but when he ran in 1877 he was defeated by Montague Tyrwhitt-Drake

References

Mayors of Victoria, British Columbia
Pre-Confederation British Columbia people
Scottish emigrants to pre-Confederation British Columbia
1881 deaths